Scouting and Guiding in Gibraltar exist as branches of the parent organisations in the United Kingdom.

Gibraltar Scouts

Gibraltar Scouts operates as a branch of the United Kingdom Scout Association, due to Gibraltar's affiliation as a British overseas territory. Gibraltar Boy Scouts were first recognised as a Branch of the Boy Scouts Association of the United Kingdom in 1913

History

The first overseas troop of The Scout Association, the 1st Gibraltar Scout Troop, was established on 27 March 1908. It has since amalgamated with the 4th Gibraltar Scout Troop, becoming the 1st/4th Gibraltar (Marques of Milford Haven's Own) Scout Group. This is the largest Group in Gibraltar with a membership of 180 members divided into two Beaver colonies, two Cub packs, two Scout troops, one Explorer Unit and a Corps of Drums. The 2nd Gibraltar Boy Scout Troop was  formed in 1910. The first Wolf Cub Pack in Gibraltar was formed in 1914. The first Rover Crew was formed by the 2nd Gibraltar Scout Group in 1928. The 3rd and 4th Gibraltar Scout Troop were formed prior to 1913.

The Gibraltar Sea Scouts arose from an amalgamation of the 5th Gibraltar Sea Scouts, formed in 1914, with the 3rd Gibraltar Sea Scouts Group. The Group is Royal Navy recognised. The group is  well known for its band, the Gibraltar Sea Scouts Pipe Band.

In 2008, to celebrate the 100th anniversary of the formation of Scouting in Gibraltar, the Gibraltar Parliament passed a motion conferring Freedom of the City of Gibraltar on The Scout Association (Gibraltar Branch).

Program
The Gibraltar Scout Promise and Law, as well as other Scouting requirements, closely follow that of the UK. Although the program activities are taken from the British system, Gibraltar Scouting is geared to the local way of life. Training for Wood Badge and leader training are conducted with the help of British and nearby affiliated Scout associations. Gibraltar Scouts participate in numerous camps and events in Gibraltar as well as throughout the UK and southern Spain.

Girlguiding Gibraltar

Girlguiding Gibraltar (formerly Gibraltar Girl Guide Association) is a Guiding organization in Gibraltar. It is one of the nine branch associations of Girlguiding UK. It is represented by Girlguiding UK at World Association of Girl Guides and Girl Scouts (WAGGGS) level and Girlguiding UK's Chief Guide is also Chief Guide for Girlguiding Gibraltar. The program is a modified form of Guiding in the United Kingdom, adapted to suit local conditions, with the same promise, and Rainbow, Brownie, Guide and Ranger groups.

History
The first Girl Guides troop in Gibraltar was formed in summer 1914, its creation was reported to the Colonial Secretary on 28 August 1914. However, the official founding year of the branch is given with 1925 and was remembered by three stamps issued on 10 October 1975.

In April 2009 the Gibraltar Parliament conferred the Honorary Freedom of the City of Gibraltar upon the local Girl Guide movement in recognition of decades of positive contribution to the community.

See also

References

External links
 The Scouts Association, Gibraltar Branch official site

Youth organisations based in Gibraltar
Overseas branches of Scouting and Guiding associations
Gibraltar
Gibraltar
Gibraltar